"Searching (For Someone Like You)" is a song written by Pee Wee Maddux, sung by Kitty Wells, and released on the Decca label (catalog no. 9-29956). In July 1956, it peaked at No. 3 on Billboards country and western juke box chart. It spent 34 weeks on the charts and was also ranked No. 5 on Billboards 1956 year-end country and western retail best seller chart and No. 9 on the year-end juke box chart.

See also
 Billboard Top Country & Western Records of 1956

References

Kitty Wells songs
1956 songs